Clockwork Indigo is the self-titled EP by Clockwork Indigo, which consists of New York hip hop groups Flatbush Zombies and the Underachievers. It was released on October 17, 2014 under Electric KooLade Records.

Background
In an interview with Crossfade of Miami New Times, Issa Gold (member of the Underachievers) spoke of how the project started:

We knew that if we were going to tour, we wanted to do a collab project together. So when the tour came up, it was like, 'Alright, let's get this project done.' We all grew up in the same neighborhood. Me and Jewice lived in the same building and spent pretty much four to five years together, every day, just learning and doing psychedelics. Meechy and Jewice are best friends who knew each other even longer before that, and Meechy and Erick were best friends for even longer before that.

Track listing

References

External links
Clockwork Indigo at Soundcloud
Official website

2014 EPs
Collaborative albums
Flatbush Zombies albums
The Underachievers albums
East Coast hip hop albums
Hip hop EPs